Hořovičky is a municipality and village in Rakovník District in the Central Bohemian Region of the Czech Republic. It has about 500 inhabitants.

Administrative parts
Villages of Bukov, Hokov and Vrbice are administrative parts of Hořovičky.

Geography
It lies in the Rakovník Uplands.

History
The first written mention of Hořovičky is from 1392.

Transport
The I/6 road, part of the European route E48, passes through the municipality. It replaces the unfinished section of the D6 motorway from Prague to Karlovy Vary.

Sights
There are three churches in the municipality, all protected as cultural monuments. The Church of the Holy Trinity is a small late Baroque church with a Neoclassical façade. The Church of Saints Cyril and Methodius was built in the Neo-Romanesque style in the early 20th century. It was built for the Protestant Church and today serves the Orthodox Church. The Church of the Exaltation of the Holy Cross in located in the village of Vrbice. It is also a Neo-Romanesque building.

Tobiášův vrch is a steel telecommunication tower on the lower peak of the eponymous hill, which also serves as an observation tower.

References

External links

Villages in Rakovník District